Jumpin' Jellyfish is a Paratower, a parachute jump–style ride at Disney California Adventure at the Disneyland Resort in Anaheim, California in the US and Tokyo DisneySea at Tokyo Disney Resort in Japan.

Jumpin' Jellyfish has a sister-themed attraction that opened in September 2001 at Tokyo DisneySea. This attraction is similar to that of the former Maliboomer, but scaled down to more child-sized proportions and rethemed.

The attraction is similar to Toy Soldiers Parachute Drop, an attraction located at Walt Disney Studios Park in France and at Hong Kong Disneyland in Hong Kong.

References

External links
Jumpin' Jellyfish at Disney California Adventure
Jumpin' Jellyfish at Tokyo DisneySea

Disney California Adventure
Tokyo DisneySea
Paradise Pier
Paradise Gardens Park
Mermaid Lagoon (Tokyo DisneySea)
Amusement rides manufactured by Intamin
Amusement rides introduced in 2001
Towers in California
Towers in Japan
2001 establishments in California
Works based on The Little Mermaid
2001 establishments in Japan